Mario Acerbi (1887–1982) was an Italian painter.

Biography
Acerbi was born in Milan. He attended the municipal school of painting in Pavia from 1900 to 1909 as a pupil of Carlo Sara, Romeo Borgognoni and Giorgio Kienerk, and was awarded the Lauzi Prize in 1907 and the Frank Prize (subsequently revoked due to a procedural error) in 1910. The artist's father Ezechiele, a well-known landscape painter and leading figure in the artistic circles of Pavia, played a crucial part in his training as a naturalistic painter. Acerbi took part in exhibitions in Turin and Milan as from 1908 with a repertoire of landscapes, portraits and flower paintings based on his father's more commercially successful models. Acerbi distinguished himself as a portrait painter with a clientele in Milan and Pavia, and received official commissions for history paintings and religious frescoes from various bodies in the Lombardy region. He died in Pavia.

Bibliography
 Elena Lissoni, Mario Acerbi, online catalogue Artgate by Fondazione Cariplo, 2010, CC BY-SA (source for the first revision of this article).

Other projects

19th-century Italian painters
Italian male painters
20th-century Italian painters
1887 births
1982 deaths
19th-century Italian male artists
20th-century Italian male artists